Qobád or Kawād  is a mythical and inspiring personality. He is the brother of Qaren who was the ruler of Ray under Nowzar. Qobad was an old man killed in battle with Barman.

Battle of Old Qobad
Under Nowzar, the Pishdādi dynasty grows weak, and Iran In the Iran-Turan war falls by the Turanian General Afrasiab, who kills Nowzar in battle. Then however, When the Iranian army was in full siege and everyone knew the defeat was certain, Qobad boldly urged the Iranians to uplift. Barman Delaware Turani enters the battlefield and calls on the opponent. Qaren asked one of his troops to go to Barman, but no one except the volunteer Qobad. Qobad did this to persuade the Iranians not to surrender to the enemy.

References

Sources
Ferdowsi Shahnameh. From the Moscow version. Mohammed Publishing. 

Shahnameh characters
Shahnameh stories